Gerry Johansson (born 1945) is a Swedish photographer who lives in Höganäs in southern Sweden. He makes "straight and pragmatic" photographs with "an objective view of a geographic location." His books include America, Sweden, Germany, Antarctic, Tokyo, and American Winter. His work is held in the collection of Moderna Museet in Stockholm, Sweden, where he has had solo exhibitions.

Life and work
Johansson was born in Örebro, Örebro County, Sweden and grew up in Varberg, Halland County, Sweden. He started photographing at age 11 and began printing his own pictures at age 15. After high school he lived with relatives in New Jersey, USA for a year. He studied for a degree in graphic design at Konstindustriskolan in Gothenburg (now the School of Design and Crafts at the University of Gothenburg), between 1965 and 1969, then worked for a photography magazine. He worked for fifteen years as a graphic designer. In 1972 he co-founded the publishing house Fyra Förläggare, specialising in photography magazines and photobooks, usually with work by Swedish documentary photographers. In 1985 he left Fyra Förläggare to work as an independent photographer.

Johansson makes "straight and pragmatic" photographs with "an objective view of a geographic location." "Almost all of his 31 photobooks are defined by their geography, if not the subject matter, and their equally-sized photographs are generally organised either alphabetically or chronologically, a bid to encourage readers to interpret them individually." He predominantly uses black and white film, which he develops and prints himself. His favourite camera is a Rolleiflex.

Johansson's book American Winter (2018) was made in the mid-western states of the USA—Kansas, Nebraska, South Dakota, North Dakota, Montana, Wyoming and Colorado—in 2017/2018, over two three-week trips.

Personal life
Johansson is married to Ann Jansson, who makes ceramic art.

Publications

Books of work by Johansson
Fotografier 1976–80. Self-published, 1980. Catalogue of an exhibition at Galleri 1+1. Edition of 1000 copies.
Halland. Fyra Förläggare, 1985. Photographs from Halland, 1932 by C. G. Rosenberg, rephotographed between 1983 and 1985 by Johansson. Text by Jan Olsheden. Edition of 1500 copies.
Betong. 1992.
Amerika = America. 1998. Edition of 1200 copies.
Sverige = Sweden. Stockholm: Byggförlaget, 2005. . Photographs from Sweden between 1988 and 2005. Published to coincide with an exhibition at Fotografins Hus in Stockholm.
Stockholm: Byggförlaget, 2009. Edition of 100 copies.
Kvidinge. Höganäs, Sweden: Johansson and Jansson, 2007. . Edition of 450 copies.
Fyrbodal. 2007.
Ulan Bator. Stockholm: Gun Gallery, 2009. Edition of 400 copies.
Dalen. Stockholm: Libraryman, 2010. Edition of 300 copies.
Pontiac. London: Mack, 2011. . Edition of 1000 copies.
God Jul och Gott Nytt År önskar Ann och Gerry. 2011.
Deutschland = Germany. London: Mack, 2012. . Edition of 1200 copies.
Öglunda. Stockholm: Gun Gallery, 2012. Edition of 500 copies.
Hattfabriken/Luckenwalde. Johansson & Jansson, 2012. Edition of 1000 copies.
Antarktis = Antarctic. Stockholm: Libraryman, 2014. . Edition of 700 copies. With a text by Thorbjörn Andersson in Swedish and English.
Tree Stone Water. Stockholm: Libraryman, 2015. Edition of 400 copies.
Tokyo. Berlin: Only Photography, 2016. With a text by Kamo no Chomei. Edition of 1200 copies.
Ravenna. Osservatorio  Fotografico, 2016. Edition of 350 copies. Second edition of 300 copies.
Tyre Choice. Stockholm: Libraryman, 2017.
Supplement: Deutschland. Johansson & Jansson, 2018. Edition of 1000 copies.
Härryda Kommun. Johansson & Jansson, 2018.
America Revised. Berlin: Only Photography, 2018. A collection of over 50 years of his work on the continent.
American Winter. London: Mack, 2018. . Edition of 2500 copies.
Halland. Johansson & Jansson, 2019.
Borås. Johansson & Jansson, 2019.
Meloni Meloni. Self-published, 2020. . Edition of 750 copies. With texts in English, Italian and Swedish.
Ehime. Tokyo: T&M, 2020. . Edition of 800 copies.
Lalendof und Klaber. Johansson & Jansson, 2020.
At Home in Sweden, Germany and America. Sweden: Tira, 2020. .

Books of work with others
Från Skåne. Malmö, Sweden: Malmö Konsthall, 1992. With work by Dawid, Johansson and Ralph Nykvist. With a text by Jacques Werup. Catalogue of an exhibition
Trivia. 1992. With work by Johansson, Carl-Johan Malmberg and Gunnar Smoliansky. Photographs and texts from EKODOK 90. . Published to coincide with an exhibition at Moderna Museet, Stockholm, Sweden. Edition of 100 copies.
Verso Nord. Stuttgart: Hartmann, 2022. With Guido Guidi. Edited by Stefania Rössl and Massimo Sordi. . With text, Rössl in conversation with Guidi and Johansson. Two volumes. In Italian and English. Photographs made around Castelfranco Veneto, Italy.

Awards
2011: , Skåne Regional Council, Skåne County, Sweden
2019: Lars Tunbjörk Prize, Tore G Wärenstam Foundation, Borås, Sweden
2020: Höganäs Municipality's cultural award, Skåne County, Sweden

Exhibitions

Solo exhibitions
Moderna Museet, Stockholm, Sweden, 1982
Odd weeks, Moderna Museet, Stockholm, Sweden, 2003
Moment, Moderna Museet, Stockholm, Sweden, 2012/2013

Group exhibitions
Framed Landscapes: European Photography Commissions 1984–2019, Madrid, Spain, 2019, part of PhotoEspaña

Collections
Johansson's work is held in the following permanent collection:
Moderna Museet, Stockholm, Sweden: over 40 photographs (as of January 2019)

References

External links

"Q & A with Gerry Johansson" by Blake Andrews
"A Walk with Gerry Johansson" interview with Jörg Colberg
Some of Johansson's books described by Josef Chladek

University of Gothenburg alumni
21st-century Swedish photographers
People from Höganäs Municipality
People from Varberg
People from Örebro
Living people
1945 births